Race Around Ireland is a non-stop bicycle race which traces a route around the coastline of Ireland. The event was first run in 2009 and is a qualifying event for Race Across America, the most famous race in the world of ultra marathon cycling.

The route varies only a little from year to year and has, since its inception, begun and finished in County Meath. In 2017 the finishing riders completed a 2,212 km route which included approximately 22,000m of total climbing.

The event is open to solo riders as well as teams of two, four and eight competitors riding in relay.
Riders decide their own rest and nutrition strategy and the winning solo riders will typically spend up to 22 hours a day in the saddle.

Riders are entitled to a support vehicle and riders must complete the course within a specified time as a finisher. The time limit in 2017 for solo men was 132 hours and for women 144 hours.

Winners 
The fastest winning solo ride in Race Around Ireland history was recorded by Christoph Strasser in 2013. The Austrian rider completed the 2,209.1 km route in 93 hours, 16 minutes at an average speed of 23.69kmh.

Nicole Reist of Switzerland made history in 2017 by becoming the first woman to lead home all the solo finishers.

References 

Cycle races in Ireland
Recurring sporting events established in 2009